USS Rushmore (LSD-47) is a  of the United States Navy. She was the second navy ship to be named for the Mount Rushmore National Memorial in the Black Hills of South Dakota.  She is the seventh ship in her class of dock landing ships and the fourth ship in that class to serve in the United States Pacific Fleet.

Rushmore was laid down on 9 November 1987, by the Avondale Shipyards, New Orleans; launched on 6 May 1989, sponsored by Mrs. Meredith Brokaw, wife of NBC News anchorman Tom Brokaw; and commissioned on 1 June 1991, at New Orleans.

Mission

The assigned mission of the dock landing ship is to transport and launch loaded amphibious craft and vehicles with their crews and embarked personnel in amphibious assaults by landing craft and amphibious vehicles.  It can render limited docking repair service to small ships and craft.

General comments

The  provides for greater storage space of weapons and equipment, improved facilities for embarked troops, greater range of operations, and the capability to embark either conventional landing craft or LCAC.  The ships incorporate materiel handling equipment including elevators, package/roller conveyors and forklifts, pallet transporters, and a turntable.  The turntable is located between the well deck and the helicopter deck forward of the boat deck to assist in the rapid turnaround of vehicles and equipment during loading/offloading operations.

History

1990s 
The ship's first assignment was to deliver three Air Cushioned Landing Craft (LCAC) to Camp Pendleton, California from Panama City, Florida. Along the way, Rushmore conducted a port visit in Jamaica, traversed the Panama Canal, and visited Rodman, Panama. Camp Pendleton was the last stop before arriving at her homeport of NS San Diego. During her first six-month deployment, Rushmore spearheaded the beach landing on Somalia during Operation Restore Hope. The largest military humanitarian operation in history, Restore Hope was designed to provide food and medical relief to the starving people of Somalia.

Rushmores 1994 WestPac deployment came almost one year ahead of schedule. She deployed with only four weeks' notice and participated in Operation Support Hope off the coast of Mombasa, Kenya, the USLO relocation in Somalia, and exercises with forces of Oman and the United Arab Emirates. During this deployment, Rushmore also was awarded a Meritorious Unit Commendation.

Rushmores 1996 deployment followed a complete and highly successful training cycle during which Rushmore earned the Blue E and the Battle E. This deployment provided numerous international training opportunities for the  Amphibious Readiness Group and the 13th Marine Expeditionary Unit (13th MEU) including Exercise Cobra Gold '96 with Thailand, Exercise Infinite Moonlight with Jordan, Exercise Red Reef with Saudi Arabia, and MEUEX '96 with Kuwait. Rushmore demonstrated its superior adaptability throughout deployment by becoming the first LSD-41-class ship to employ Rigid Hull Inflatable Boats (RHIBs) for the SPECWAR Detachment.

Rushmore concluded 1996 with a port visit to Mazatlán, Mexico. The ship earned its second consecutive Battle E in 1996.

Rushmore is the test platform for the Smart Ship program known as Gator 17. The ship was outfitted with several new technologies to reduce workload and manning levels. Information from the program aboard Rushmore will be used to assist in the design of the LPD-17 class amphibious ships. Installation was completed at the end of 1997.

Rushmore deployed in 1999 with the  Amphibious Ready Group and the 11th Marine Expeditionary Unit (11th MEU).  During this deployment, Rushmore participated in Exercise Iron Magic with the United Arab Emirates and Exercise Red Reef with Saudi Arabia.  Rushmore also had the distinction of becoming the first United States Naval warship to visit Doha, Qatar in 10 years.  Other port visits included Japan, Thailand, Saudi Arabia, UAE, Singapore, Guam, Australia and Hawaii. 
On 12 March 1999, the ship made history when then Commander Michelle J. Howard ( later assumed command of United States Naval Forces Europe and Naval Forces Africa before retiring in December 2017 as a full Admiral) became its commanding officer and the first African American woman to Command a US Navy ship.
Rushmore returned to San Diego in December 1999 and became the first "Smart Ship" to complete a six-month Western Pacific deployment.

2000s
With the new millennium, came a year of local operations for Rushmore. Rushmore participated in CARAT 2001 in cooperation with other navies in the Western Pacific, South China Sea and Southeast Asia. Returning home just days prior to the September 11 attacks,  Rushmore began preparations to deploy to areas of national security interests. After coming out of "the yards" USS Rushmore participated in RIMPAC 2002 with a host of nations off the shores of Hawaii. The ship set sail in December 2002 in support of Operation Iraqi Freedom as part of the Tarawa Amphibious Ready Group (ARG).

The ship deployed on 6 December 2004 once again in support of Operation Iraqi Freedom as part of the  Expeditionary Strike Group (ESG 5).  On the way to the Fifth Fleet Area of Responsibility, the 2004 Indian Ocean earthquake and tsunami occurred, which would change the course of Rushmore and begin a massive U.S. military humanitarian operation, dubbed Operation Unified Assistance.  The tsunami that flooded parts of Southeast Asia took the lives of more than 100,000 people in a matter of hours.  USS Rushmore and the elements of Expeditionary Strike Group Five were called into action.

The ship became an afloat staging base for military helicopters to refuel and transport supplies.  USS Rushmore launched both LCACs bringing tons of food and water ashore for distribution to survivors.  Once the operation ended, Rushmore reset a course to the Persian Gulf to support Maritime Security Operations, and help defend Iraq's Kwar Al Amaya and Al Basra Oil Platforms.  The Marines of the 15th Marine Expeditionary Unit deployed to Kuwait, and went further north into areas of Iraq before they were brought back on board in early April.

Rushmore sailors enjoyed two port visits during their two months in the Persian Gulf, one visit to the Mid-Eastern country of Bahrain, the other, a trip to the port of Jebel Ali, United Arab Emirates.  During the transit home, Rushmore stopped for a port visit to Cairns, Australia.  Rushmore returned to the ship's homeport of San Diego, California on 6 June 2005.

The ship completed a three-month maintenance period and participated in Exercise Rim of the Pacific (RIMPAC) off the coast of Hawaii from June to August 2006.

Rushmore began 2007 by completing work ups with the Bonhomme Richard (ESG 5).  They loaded more than 400 Marines of the 13th MEU onboard along with their equipment to prepare for the transit to the Middle East.

On 16 February 2007, Rushmore was awarded the 2006 Battle "E" award.

As 10 April 2007 arrived Rushmore was ready to get underway for deployment to the Middle East. Rushmore visited several different ports, including Guam, Singapore, Jebel Ali, Dubai and Bahrain.

On 1 December 2007, Rushmore became the first ship since the September 11 terrorist attacks to host a United States Navy open house while inport Seal Beach, California. Thousands showed up to tour the ship. The crew took visitors through the bridge, medical center, Combat Information Center, and other external places on the ship.

Rushmore certified in ULTRA-C in May 2008 and sailed up to Seattle, Washington, to take part in the Centennial Celebration of the Great White Fleet on 22 May.  She participated in a parade of ships and later hosted tours to both the general public and guests for the gala.
In late September 2008, Rushmore sailed to Esquimalt, British Columbia, Canada, to serve as the test platform for developing ASW systems in the Nanoose Firing Range.

Upon their return home, Rushmore finalized their preparations for the Congressionally-mandated Navy's Board of Inspection and Survey (INSURV) on 27 October 2008.  She also underwent ULTRA-E in November 2008.

2010s
On 12 July 2012, Rushmore successfully completed its material inspection by the navy's Board of Inspection and Survey (INSURV) assessment and was found fit for sustained combat operations.

This deployment to the Western Pacific and Indian Ocean included a brief port visit at Pearl Harbor, Hawaii; participation in Exercise Crocodilo in Timor-Leste; a port visit at Darwin, Australia; participation in Exercise Eager Mace in Kuwait; a brief port visit to Naval Support Activity Bahrain; participation in Exercise Iron Magic in UAE; participation in Exercise Red Reef in Saudi Arabia; a visit to Port Kahlifa near Abu Dhabi, UAE; an equipment washdown and agricultural inspection in Aqaba, Jordan; a visit to Hong Kong; and a second visit to Pearl Harbor during the return transit.

In June 2015, Rushmore made news for rescuing 65 people who were stranded on a makeshift raft in the Makassar Strait after their ferry capsized.

2020s
In December 2020 the U.S. Navy's Report to Congress on the Annual Long-Range Plan for Construction of Naval Vessels stated that the ship was planned to be placed Out of Commission in Reserve in 2024.

Notes

References

External links

  USS Rushmore official website
 

 

Whidbey Island-class dock landing ships
Cold War amphibious warfare vessels of the United States
Amphibious warfare vessels of the United States
Ships built in Bridge City, Louisiana
1989 ships